The Catalyst is an American weekly newspaper published by students of Colorado College Friday mornings of the school year in Colorado Springs, Colorado.

The Catalyst is the official and only student newspaper of Colorado College and has a print circulation of roughly 1,500 and is circulated on the college's campus and in downtown Colorado Springs.

The Catalyst consists of five sections: News, Sports, Active Life, Life, and Opinion.

The Catalyst has been in print since the 1890s, and has undergone dozens of transformations over the years. The newspaper was originally called "The Tiger."

The newspaper was instrumental in the Foundation for Individual Rights in Education's (FIRE) case on Colorado College's uniquely limited freedom of speech. FIRE had named Colorado College on its Red Alert list for several years over its treatment of two students who distributed a satirical flyer which parodied the college's Feminist and Gender Studies newsletter. Three articles in The Catalyst were cited by FIRE.

During the FAA's highly publicized investigation of a group of Colorado College students in 2012, the FAA, as well as several media outlets, including the Associated Press, cited The Catalyst's reporting on the investigation. The small weekly's editor at the time, Jesse Paul, broke the news of investigation.

References

External links
 thecatalystnews.com -- The Catalyst Website

Student newspapers published in Colorado
Publications established in the 1890s
1890s establishments in Colorado